SEEC may refer to:
 Stock Exchange Executive Council
 South East England Councils
 Skagit Environmental Endowment Commission
 Saturna Ecological Education Centre
 Shihlin Electric and Engineering Corporation